Peroneal may refer to: 

 Relating to the lateral compartment of leg
 Peroneal artery
 Peroneal vein
 Peroneus muscles
 Peroneal nerve

See also
Perineal (disambiguation)
Peritoneal